A Tjasker is a type of small drainage windmill used in the Netherlands and north Germany. There are seven tjaskers remaining in Overijssel, all located in the marshy region in the northwest corner of the province.

Locations

Giethoorn
Molengat

The paaltjasker was built in 1979 in Giethoorn and is in private ownership. Its operational but has no real function.

Noord

The paaltjasker was built in 1970 by well known tjasker builder Roelof Dijksma to drain his and his neighbours garden.

Zuid

The paaltjasker was built in 1988 and is part of museum  't Olde Maat Uus showing life in Giethoorn about a century ago. The tjasker is operational but because of its sheltered location it is powered by an electric motor. It can be visited during opening hours of the museum.

Jonen

The paaltjasker was built in 2010 on the initiative of Stichting Natuurlijk Jonen which works on the protection of the cultural and natural landscape around hamlet Jonen. The tjasker has four symmetrical Common sails that can be covered with wooden slats.

Ossenzijl/Kalenberg
Nameless tjasker on Hoogeweg

The paaltjasker was built in 1963 by well known tjasker builder Roelof Dijksma. It was donated to Staatsbosbeheer by monthly Overijssel magazine De Mars to celebrate its 10th anniversary and was the start of a small renaissance for tjaskers in general. The tjasker has four symmetrical Common sails that can be covered with wooden slats and is used to pump water into the quaking bog. .

Nameless tjasker on Hoogeweg near De Weerribben visitor centre

The paaltjasker was built in 1977 by Jac. Punter of Paaslo as a copy of the above-mentioned tjasker built by Dijksma. It was repaired and moved about 200 m in 1984. The tjasker is close to the Staatsbosbeheer visitor centre of nature reserve De Weerribben near Ossenzijl and is used to pump water into the reed beds in summer.

Sint Jansklooster
De Foeke

The paaltjasker was built in 1968 by well known tjasker builder Roelof Dijksma for nature conservation organisation Natuurmonumenten near their then newly built visitor centre De Foeke in nature reserve De Wieden near Sint Jansklooster.

Dutch Wikipedia articles
Molengat (tjasker)
Noord (tjasker)
Zuid (tjasker)
Tjasker Jonen
Tjasker Kalenberg
Tjasker Ossenzijl
De Foeke

References

Windmills in Overijssel
Windpumps in the Netherlands